Joe Davis (22 May 1941 – 5 August 2016) was a Scottish footballer, who played for Third Lanark, Hibernian, and Carlisle United.

References

External links 
Joe Davis, www.ihibs.co.uk

1941 births
2016 deaths
Footballers from Glasgow
Association football fullbacks
Scottish footballers
Glasgow United F.C. players
Third Lanark A.C. players
Hibernian F.C. players
Carlisle United F.C. players
Scottish Football League players
English Football League players
Toronto City players
United Soccer Association players
Scottish expatriate sportspeople in Canada
Expatriate soccer players in Canada
Scottish expatriate footballers